The Domald is a left tributary of the river Târnava Mică in Romania. It discharges into the Târnava Mică in Coroi.

References

Rivers of Romania
Rivers of Mureș County